1971 in philosophy

Events
Chomsky–Foucault debate

Publications
 G.E.M. Anscombe, Causality and Determination, Cambridge University Press
 A.J. Ayer, Russell and Moore: The Analytical Heritage, London: Macmillan
 Keith Campbell, Body and Mind, New York: Doubleday
 R. G. Collingwood, Ruskin's Philosophy, Chicester: Quentin Nelson
 Dorothy Emmet and Alasdair MacIntyre (ed.) Sociological Theory and Philosophical Analysis, New York: Macmillan
 Antony Flew, An Introduction to Western Philosophy, London: Thames & Hudson
 John Hick, Arguments for the Existence of God, London: Macmillan
 Alasdair MacIntyre, Against the Self-Images of the Age: Essays on Ideology and Philosophy.
 John Rawls, A Theory of Justice (first edition), Harvard University Press
 John Searle (ed.), The Philosophy of Language, Oxford University Press
 P.F. Strawson, Logico-Linguistic Papers, London: Methuen
 G.J. Warnock, The Object of Morality, London: Methuen
 Ivan Illich, Deschooling Society

Deaths
May 5: W. D. Ross, Scottish philosopher (born 1877)

References

Philosophy
20th-century philosophy
Philosophy by year